Gianluca Ferrari (born 30 June 1997) is an Argentine professional footballer who plays as a centre-back for Argentine Primera División club Godoy Cruz.

Career
Ferrari's career got underway in Italy, with the defender featuring for Scandicci's youth teams; in which time he was loaned out to Latina's ranks. In 2016, Ferrari completed a move to Serie D's Montecatini. He scored one goal in twenty-three appearances in 2016–17 as the club finished tenth. Ferrari had to return to Argentina in 2017 following bureaucratic issues. In August 2017, Ferrari joined San Lorenzo of the Argentine Primera División. His professional football debut arrived on 7 October in the league against Banfield. 

In January 2020, Ferrari was loaned to Godoy Cruz for 18 months without a purchase option. On 10 February 2021, Ferrari became a part of a swap-deal between San Lorenzo and Godoy Cruz, with Jalil Elías moving to San Lorenzo, in exchange for 70% of Ferrari's pass.

Personal life
He is the brother of fellow footballer Franco Ferrari.

Career statistics
.

References

External links

1997 births
Living people
Footballers from Rosario, Santa Fe
Argentine footballers
Argentine people of Italian descent
Association football defenders
Serie D players
Argentine Primera División players
Scandicci Calcio players
Latina Calcio 1932 players
San Lorenzo de Almagro footballers
Godoy Cruz Antonio Tomba footballers